Solanum berthaultii (syn. Solanum tarijense) is a species of wild potato in the family Solanaceae, native to Bolivia and northwestern Argentina. It is being extensively studied for its resistance to Phytophthora infestans, the late potato blight, and for other traits to improve the domestic potato Solanum tuberosum.

References

berthaultii
Flora of Bolivia
Flora of Northwest Argentina
Plants described in 1944